Chemban Vinod Jose (born 24 May 1976) is an Indian actor, film producer and screenwriter, who predominantly works in Malayalam films. He is a physiotherapist by profession. He is an established character actor and has appeared in over 50 films, mostly in comedic roles.

He is best known for his performance in Amen (2013), Tamaar Padaar (2014), Sapthamashree Thaskaraha (2014), Iyobinte Pusthakam (2014), Kohinoor (2015),Oru Second Class Yathra (2015), Churuli (2021) and Vikram (2022).

Career

He made his acting debut with the 2010 crime film Nayakan, playing an antagonistic role.

In 2017, he made his screenwriter debut with the crime drama Angamaly Diaries, a major critical and commercial success in Malayalam that year. In the following year, he co-produced the thriller Swathanthryam Ardharathriyil. In 2018, he won the Best Actor Award at 49th International Film Festival of India for his leading role in Ee.Ma.Yau.

Awards 
 Vanita film awards 2016 for Best Supporting Actor
 Vanita film awards 2017 for Best villain
 6th South Indian International Movie Awards for Best Actor in a negative role Malayalam 
 5th South Indian International Movie Awards for Best Supporting Actor Malayalam
 49th International Film Festival of India  2018 - IFFI Best Actor Award (Male)

Filmography

As actor 
All films are in Malayalam language unless otherwise noted.

As script writer

As producer

References

External links
 

Living people
Indian male film actors
Male actors from Kochi
IFFI Best Actor (Male) winners
Male actors in Malayalam cinema
21st-century Indian male actors
Place of birth missing (living people)
1976 births
People from Angamaly